"Patience" is a song by British boy band Take That. It was released on 13 November 2006 as the first single from their comeback album, Beautiful World. The single peaked at the top of the UK Singles Chart, and also topped the charts in Germany, Spain and Switzerland, as well as peaking in the top ten of the charts in Denmark, Ireland, Italy, Austria and Sweden.

Chart performance
"Patience" debuted at number four on the UK Singles Chart and rose to number one in its second week, staying there for four weeks. It was the UK's eighth best-selling single of 2006 and spent eleven weeks in the top ten, making it the longest that any Take That single had spent in the top ten until the release of 2007's "Rule the World". The song also became the 30th best selling single of 2007, the following year. The song just missed out on being the UK Christmas number one of 2006, being knocked off the top spot on Christmas Eve by The X Factor winner Leona Lewis' "A Moment Like This".

The song was also the 20th best selling single of 2006 in Ireland. On 18 February 2007, it re-entered the UK top 10 after 14 weeks in the charts and on 11 August 2007, following the band's performance at the Concert for Diana, the single reentered the UK top 40. The song debuted at number one on the German Singles Chart, and since its release it has sold over 150,000 copies being certified Gold by the IFPI. The song, as of March 2017, has sold 713,000 copies in the UK.

Accolades
The song also won the Best British Single Award at the 2007 BRIT Awards and was voted The Record of the Year for 2006, polling 15.5% of the final vote.

Usage in media
The song is used as the opening theme for the German-Austrian medical drama television series Der Bergdoktor.

Reception and legacy
In 2009, Nicky Wire of the Manic Street Preachers hailed "Patience" as "the greatest comeback single in history. If Neil Young had written it, people would be calling it a masterpiece." He praised the dark lyrics of the chorus and concluded: "You get so many alternative bands banging on about how to make perfect pop, and ['Patience'] kicks all their arses." Tom Eames of Digital Spy felt similarly, saying in a 2016 article that "'Patience' remains one of pop's greatest ever comeback songs." In 2015, Kitty Empire of The Guardian wrote that the song "remains one of the strongest songs [Take That] have ever put out."

Music video
The video was directed by David Mould and was shot in Iceland. The video shows each of the members trekking across the rough terrain dragging their microphone stands. After the middle eight, the band are shown on top of a cliff singing the song together at night whilst a storm occurs behind them.

Track listing
Digital download single  (Released 13 November 2006)
 "Patience" – 3:20

UK CD single (1714832)
 "Patience" – 3:20
 "Beautiful Morning" – 3:37

Worldwide (except UK) maxi single, UK iTunes E.P.
 "Patience" – 3:20
 "Beautiful Morning" – 3:37
 "Trouble With Me" – 3:24
 "Patience" (Video) – 3:21

Personnel
Gary Barlow – lead vocals
Howard Donald – backing vocals
Jason Orange – backing vocals
Mark Owen – backing vocals

Charts

Weekly charts

Year-end charts

Decade-end charts

Certifications

Cover versions
Indie-rock band The Wombats also chose to cover this song on 9 January 2008 for BBC Radio 1's Live Lounge. Hank Marvin also covered this song on his 2007 album Guitar Man and Nick Lachey released a version as a single in the US.

References

External links

2006 singles
Brit Award for British Single
UK Singles Chart number-one singles
European Hot 100 Singles number-one singles
Number-one singles in Germany
Number-one singles in Scotland
Number-one singles in Spain
Number-one singles in Switzerland
Song recordings produced by John Shanks
Take That songs
2009 singles
Nick Lachey songs
Songs written by John Shanks
Songs written by Gary Barlow
Songs written by Mark Owen
Songs written by Jason Orange
Songs written by Howard Donald
Rock ballads
2006 songs
Polydor Records singles
Music videos shot in Iceland